Sarah Cassidy may refer to:

Sarah Cassidy, character in Panic (2000 film)
Sarah Cassidy, character in House at the End of the Street
Sarah Cassidy (singer)
Sarah Cassidy, member of Lemonescent band